The 1870 West Virginia gubernatorial election took place on October 27, 1870, to elect the governor of West Virginia.

This was the last election of a governor to a 2-year term. Starting in 1872, West Virginia would elect its governor to a 4-year term.

Results

References

1870
gubernatorial
West Virginia
October 1870 events